Blindekuh may refer to:

 Blindekuh (operetta), an operetta by Johann Strauss II
 Blind man's bluff (game), a game called Blindekuh in German
 Blindekuh (restaurant), two restaurants in Switzerland